Paolo Alberi (also Paolo Albero) was a Roman Catholic prelate who served as Archbishop of Dubrovnik (1588–1591).

Biography
On 22 August 1588, Paolo Alberi was appointed during the papacy of Pope Sixtus V as Archbishop of Dubrovnik. He served as Archbishop of Dubrovnik until his death on 31 July 1591.

Episcopal succession
While bishop, he was the principal co-consecrator of:

See also 
Catholic Church in Croatia

References

External links and additional sources
 (for Chronology of Bishops) 
 (for Chronology of Bishops) 

17th-century Roman Catholic archbishops in the Republic of Venice
Bishops appointed by Pope Sixtus V